Spermacoce keyensis, the Florida false buttonweed, is a species of plants in the family Rubiaceae, first discovered in the Florida Keys. It is found in southern Florida, Bahamas, and the extreme southern tip of Texas (Cameron County).

References

External links
Atlas of Florida Vascular Plants
Wild Florida Photo, nature photography  by Paul Rebmann
All Things Plant, Florida False Buttonweed (Spermacoce keyensis)
Gardening Europe, Spermacoce floridana Spermacoce keyensis Small
ZipcodeZoo

keyensis
Flora of Florida
Flora of the Bahamas
Flora of Texas
Florida Keys
Plants described in 1913
Taxa named by John Kunkel Small
Flora without expected TNC conservation status